Ten Count may refer to:

 Ten Count (manga), a Japanese Boys-Love manga by Rihito Takarai
 Ten Count, the 18th episode of the 7th season of the American police procedural drama Law & Order: Criminal Intent